Aylesbury is a constituency created in 1553 — created as a single-member seat in 1885 — represented in the House of Commons of the United Kingdom since 2019 by Rob Butler of the Conservative Party.

Constituency profile 
Aylesbury expanded significantly after World War II, in a diverse way with a similar proportion of this recent development being social housing estates as private estates.

Workless claimants who were registered jobseekers were in November 2012 lower than the regional average of 2.4% and national average of 3.8%, at 2.2% of the population based on a statistical compilation by The Guardian.

Whereas the average house price is higher than the national average, in the Aylesbury Vale authority (which largely overlaps) this in the first quarter of 2013 was £262,769, the lowest of the four authorities in Buckinghamshire and this compares to the highest county average of £549,046 in South Bucks District.

History

Early form

The seat was a much narrower, generally urban borough with two-member status at Westminster from its grant of a limited franchise in 1553 until the passing of the Great Reform Act 1832. 

In 1804, following the voiding of the election of the sitting MP, Robert Bent, for corruption, the franchise was extended to the 40s. freeholders of the Three Hundreds of Aylesbury (Aylesbury, Risborough, and Stone). Consequently, the contents of the Parliamentary Borough were defined within the 1832 Reform Act itself as the Three Hundreds of Aylesbury. This extended the seat to include Wendover and Princes Risborough.

The Borough continued to elect two MPs until its abolition by the Redistribution of Seats Act 1885 and transformation into a large county division, formally named the Mid or Aylesbury Division of Buckinghamshire.  It was one of three divisions formed from the undivided three-member Parliamentary County of Buckinghamshire, the other two being the Northern or Buckingham Division and the Southern or Wycombe Division.  As well as the areas previously represented by the abolished Borough, the reconstituted seat included Linslade to the north-east and Chesham to the south-east. Since then national boundary reviews have seen a gradual reduction in its physical size as its population has grown (see Boundaries Section below).

Political history

The Conservative Party has held the seat since 1924, and held it at the 2015 general election with a 50.7% share of the vote.  The result made the seat the 133rd safest of the Conservative Party's 331 seats by percentage of majority.  The closest result since 1929 was in 1966 when the Labour Party candidate fell 7.4% short of a majority.

In June 2016, an estimated 51.8% of local adults voting in the EU membership referendum chose to leave the European Union instead of to remain. This was matched in two January 2018 votes in Parliament by its MP.

Frontbenchers
David Lidington, the previous incumbent, was the Secretary of State for Justice in Theresa May's cabinet since succeeding Liz Truss in the 2017 cabinet reshuffle, before becoming the effective First Secretary of State in the place of Damian Green in 2018's new year's reshuffle. During the premiership of David Cameron he served as Minister for Europe, campaigning unsuccessfully (in the constituency as well as the whole country) to remain in the EU. From 2007 to 2010 he had been his party's Shadow Secretary of State for Northern Ireland.

MPs who have received honours
Stanley Reed edited The Times of India from 1907 until 1924 and received correspondence from the major figures of India such as Mahatma Gandhi. In all he lived in India for fifty years. He was respected in the United Kingdom as an expert on Indian current affairs. He devised the sobriquet for Jaipur, 'the Pink City of India'.

Boundaries and boundary changes 

1885–1918: The Sessional Divisions of Aylesbury, Chesham, and Linslade, and parts of the second Sessional Division of Desborough and the Sessional Division of Winslow.

1918–1945: The Borough of Aylesbury, the Urban Districts of Beaconsfield and Chesham, the Rural District of Amersham, the part of the Rural District of Aylesbury not included in the Buckingham Division, in the Rural District of Long Crendon the parish of Towersey, and in the Rural District of Wycombe the parishes of Bledlow, Bradenham, Ellesborough, Great and Little Hampden, Great and Little Kimble, Horsenden, Hughenden, Ilmer, Monks Risborough, Princes Risborough, Radnage, Saunderton, and Wendover.

Linslade was transferred to the Buckingham Division and Amersham and Beaconsfield were transferred from the Wycombe Division.

1945–1950: The House of Commons (Redistribution of Seats) Act 1944 set up Boundaries Commissions to carry out periodic reviews of the distribution of parliamentary constituencies. It also authorised an initial review to subdivide abnormally large constituencies in time for the 1945 election.  This was implemented by the Redistribution of Seats Order 1945 under which Buckinghamshire was allocated an additional seat.  As a consequence, the parts of the (revised) Rural District of Wycombe in the Aylesbury Division, including Hughenden and Princes Risborough (but not Wendover which had been moved from the Rural District of Wycombe to that of Aylesbury by the reorganisation of local authorities in Buckinghamshire), were transferred to Wycombe.

There were no further changes and the revised composition of the constituency, after taking account of changes to local authorities, was: The Borough of Aylesbury, the Urban Districts of Beaconsfield and Chesham, the Rural District of Amersham, parts of the Rural Districts of Aylesbury and Wing, and the part of the Rural District of Bullingdon in Buckinghamshire.

1950–1974: The Borough of Aylesbury, the Urban District of Chesham, the Rural District of Aylesbury, and in the Rural District of Amersham the parishes of Ashley Green, Chartridge, Cholesbury-cum-St Leonards, Great Missenden, Latimer, Lee, and Little Missenden.

Beaconsfield and southern parts of the Rural District of Amersham (including Amersham itself) were transferred to the new County Constituency of South Buckinghamshire.  The boundary with Buckingham was redrawn to align with the northern boundary of the Rural District of Aylesbury.

1974–1983: The Borough of Aylesbury, the Rural District of Aylesbury, and in the Rural District of Wycombe the parishes of Bledlow-cum-Saunderton, Bradenham, Ellesborough, Great and Little Hampden, Great and Little Kimble, Ibstone, Lacey Green, Longwick-cum-Ilmer, Princes Risborough, Radnage, and Stokenchurch.

Parts of the Rural District of Wycombe, including Princes Risborough (but excluding Hughenden), transferred back from Wycombe.  Chesham and the northern part of the Rural District of Amersham included in the new County Constituency of Chesham and Amersham.

1983–1997: The District of Aylesbury Vale wards of Aston Clinton, Aylesbury Central, Bedgrove, Elmhurst, Gatehouse, Grange, Mandeville, Meadowcroft, Oakfield, Southcourt, Wendover, and Weston Turville, the District of Chiltern wards of Ballinger and South Heath, Great Missenden, and Prestwood and Heath End, and the District of Wycombe wards of Bledlow-cum-Saunderton, Icknield, Lacey Green and Hampden, Naphill-cum-Bradenham, Princes Risborough, and Stokenchurch.

Great Missenden transferred from Chesham and Amersham.  Rural areas to the north and west of the town of Aylesbury transferred to Buckingham.

1997–2010: The District of Aylesbury Vale wards of Aylesbury Central, Bedgrove, Elmhurst, Gatehouse, Grange, Mandeville, Meadowcroft, Oakfield, Southcourt, Wendover, and Weston Turville, the District of Chiltern wards of Ballinger and South Heath, Great Missenden, and Prestwood and Heath End, and the District of Wycombe wards of Bledlow-cum-Saunderton, Icknield, Lacey Green and Hampden, Naphill-cum-Bradenham, Princes Risborough, and Stokenchurch.

Minor changes, including the transfer of District of Aylesbury Vale ward of Aston Clinton to Buckingham.

2010–present: The District of Aylesbury Vale wards of Aston Clinton, Aylesbury Central, Bedgrove, Coldharbour, Elmhurst and Watermead, Gatehouse, Mandeville and Elm Farm, Oakfield, Quarrendon, Southcourt, Walton Court and Hawkslade, and Wendover, and the District of Wycombe wards of Bledlow and Bradenham, Greater Hughenden, Lacey Green, Speen and the Hampdens, Stokenchurch, and Radnage.

Hughenden transferred from Wycombe.  Princes Risborough transferred to Buckingham, offset against return of Aston Clinton.  Great Missenden returned to Chesham and Amersham.

The constituency is based on the large town of Aylesbury and its suburbs as well as a small swathe of villages broken up by woods and cultivated land in the centre of the Chilterns which cover most of Buckinghamshire and parts of three other counties.

Members of Parliament

MPs 1553–1659 
Constituency created (1553)

Returned one member to the First and Second Protectorate Parliaments

Returned two members to the Third Protectorate Parliament and thereafter
Back to Members of Parliament

MPs 1659–1885 

Back to Members of Parliament

MPs 1885–present 
Under the Redistribution of Seats Act 1885, the parliamentary borough of Aylesbury was abolished. The name was transferred to a new, larger, county division of Buckinghamshire, which elected one Member of Parliament (MP).

Back to Members of Parliament

Elections

Elections in the 2010s

Back to Elections

Elections in the 2000s

Back to Elections

Elections in the 1990s

Back to Elections

Elections in the 1980s

Back to Elections

Elections in the 1970s

Back to Elections

Elections in the 1960s

Back to Elections

Elections in the 1950s

Back to Elections

Elections in the 1940s

General Election 1939–40:

Another General Election was required to take place before the end of 1940. The political parties had been making preparations for an election to take place from 1939 and by the end of this year, the following candidates had been selected; *Conservative:
Stanley Reed
Liberal: Atholl Robertson 
Labour: Reginald Groves
Back to Elections

Elections in the 1930s 

Back to Elections

Elections in the 1920s 

Back to Elections

Elections in the 1910s 

Back to Elections

Elections in the 1900s

Back to Elections

Elections in the 1890s

Back to Elections

Elections in the 1880s

 Caused by Rothschild's elevation to the peerage, becoming Lord Rothschild.

 

Back to Elections

Elections in the 1870s

 
 

Back to Elections

Elections in the 1860s

 
 

 

Back to Elections

Elections in the 1850s

 
 

 On the original count, both Smith and Wentworth received 535 votes, meaning there were three MPs elected. However, after scrutiny, Wentworth lost one vote and was declared unduly elected on 2 August 1859.

 
 

 Caused by Bethell's appointment as Attorney General for England and Wales

 Caused by Bethell's appointment as Solicitor General for England and Wales

 

 
 

 

 Caused by the 1850 by-election being declared void on petition due to treating and bribery.

 

 Caused by Nugent-Grenville's death. Houghton retired before polling.
Back to Elections

Elections in the 1840s

 

 Caused by Deering's election being declared void on petition due to treating by his agents.

 

 

Back to top

Elections in the 1830s

 

 

 Caused by Praed's death

 
 
 

 
 
 
 

 
 
 

 
 
 

 

 Caused by Nugent-Grenville's appointment as a Lord Commissioner of the Treasury

 
 

Back to top

See also
List of parliamentary constituencies in Buckinghamshire

Notes

References

Sources

 British Parliamentary Election Results 1885–1918, compiled and edited by F.W.S. Craig (Macmillan Press 1974)
 British Parliamentary Election Results 1918–1949, compiled and edited by F.W.S. Craig (Macmillan Press, revised edition 1977)

Aylesbury
Parliamentary constituencies in Buckinghamshire
Constituencies of the Parliament of the United Kingdom established in 1553